Yoogan is a 2015 Indian Tamil horror, suspense thriller film directed by Kamal G. Starring Yashmith and Sakshi Agarwal in the lead roles along with Siddhu GRN, Pradeep Balaji, Shyam Kirthivasan, Tarun Chakarvarthy and Suresh Pillai.

Rashaanth Arwin composed the music For the film. Alex Premnath composed the background score and cinematography was by Ravi Arumugam.

It is a horror story which revolves around the problems that happen in an IT company. The movie got released on 24 April 2015.

Cast
 Yashmith as Vinay
 Sakshi Agarwal as Pooja
 Siddhu GRN as David
 Pradeep Balaji as Amir
 Shyam Kirthivasan as Rahul
 Manoj as Arun
 Tarun Chakravarthy as ACP
 Suresh Pillai as Raghu
 Venkatrenga Gupta as CEO

Production
Real makeup and not VFX was used for the film. The film was shot during the nighttime near Kodaikanal.

Soundtrack
Music for the film is composed by debutant Rashaanth Arwin and the background score is composed by Alex Premnath.

Release 
The Times of India gave the film a rating of two out of five stars and wrote that "A clichéd horror film that fails to give you the thrills". Malini Mannath of The New Indian Express wrote that "Yoogan at best is a mild thriller, more of a stepping stone for the debutant maker".

References

External links
 
 
 

2015 films
2010s Tamil-language films